David G. McDonough is a member of the New York State Assembly, representing the 14th district, which includes portions of the town of Hempstead in Nassau County on Long Island. A Republican, McDonough was first elected through a special election in 2002.

McDonough formerly served in the United States Coast Guard and the United States Air Force and later earned a Bachelor of Arts degree in economics from Columbia University. He also graduated from the American Academy of Dramatic Arts.

Prior to elected office, he served as the past president of the Nassau County Council of Chambers of Commerce. Prior to that, from 1994 to 1998, McDonough served four terms as president of the Merrick Chamber of Commerce.

In 2001, Assemblywoman Kate Murray was elected as clerk of the town of Hempstead, vacating the Assembly seat.  As a result, a special election was called, and McDonough was nominated by Republicans as their candidate.  In a competitive election, he defeated Democrat Steve November 52% to 48%. Since then, he has never faced serious opposition for reelection.

In the Assembly, McDonough is the chairman of a Task Force on Public Safety, and is the ranking member on the Assembly Transportation Committee. He and his wife, Carolyn, reside in Merrick, New York and have three children and four grandchildren.

References

External links
New York State Assembly Member Website
Legislative Report Card from The Business Council of New York

1930s births
Living people
Republican Party members of the New York State Assembly
American Academy of Dramatic Arts alumni
Columbia College (New York) alumni
People from Merrick, New York
21st-century American politicians